Costa Rica participated at the 2018 Summer Youth Olympics in Buenos Aires, Argentina from 6 to 18 October 2018.

Beach volleyball

Costa Rica qualified a boys' based on their performance at the 2018 AFECAVOL Zone U19 Championship.

 Boys' tournament - 1 team of 2 athletes

Fencing

Costa Rica was given a quota to compete by the tripartite committee.

 Girls' Épée – Karina Dyner

Futsal

Boys' tournament

Group stage

Gymnastics

Artistic
Costa Rica qualified one gymnast based on its performance at the 2018 American Junior Championship.

 Girls' artistic individual all-around - Camila Montoya

Swimming

Costa Rica qualified 2 athletes (1 boy and 1 girl) to compete in swimming.

 Boys: José David Solis (Men's 100m and 200m Breaststroke)	 	
 Girls: Beatriz Padrón (Women's 50m Free, 50m and 100m Butterfly)

References

2018 in Costa Rican sport
Nations at the 2018 Summer Youth Olympics
Costa Rica at the Youth Olympics